Khotbeh Sara Rural District is a rural district (dehestan) in Kargan Rud District, Talesh County, Gilan Province, Iran. At the 2006 census, its population was 13,495, in 3,436 families. The rural district has 22 villages.

References 

Rural Districts of Gilan Province
Talesh County